SOKO Köln (English title: Cologne P.D.) is a German police procedural television series that premiered on 22 October 2003 on ZDF. It is the fourth offshoot of SOKO München, launched in 1978 under the name SOKO 5113. "SOKO" is an abbreviation of the German word Sonderkommission, which means "special investigative team".

Cast and characters

Current

Past

Crossover
On 3 April 2013, five SOKO teams were brought together for a five-part special titled SOKO – Der Prozess. In it, the teams from Munich, Cologne, Leipzig, Stuttgart, and Wismar have to solve the murder of a police officer. The five episodes were shown across Germany from 30 September to 4 October 2013.

Episode list

Season 1

Season 2

Season 3

Season 4

Season 5

Season 6

Season 7

Season 8

Season 9

SOKO – Der Prozess

Season 10

Season 11

Season 12

See also
 List of German television series

References

External links
 
 SOKO Köln on the ZDF website
 Episode guide on fernsehserien.de

2003 German television series debuts
2010s German television series
ZDF original programming
German-language television shows
German television spin-offs
German crime television series
2000s German police procedural television series
2010s German police procedural television series
2020s German police procedural television series
Television shows set in Cologne